St. Ita's Church is a Roman Catholic church in the Edgewater neighborhood of Chicago. The church building was designed by Henry J. Schlacks in the Neo-Gothic style and completed in 1927. It is located at 5500 North Broadway.

References

External links
St. Ita's Church at Emporis
St. Ita Parish - The True Story from the Edgewater Historical Society
A Tour of the Church of St Ita

Ita's Church
Roman Catholic churches completed in 1927
Gothic Revival church buildings in Illinois
Ita's Church
20th-century Roman Catholic church buildings in the United States